Gustavus Adolphus of the Palatinate (Prince Palatine Gustavus Adolphus; 14 January 1632 – 9 January 1641), was the last son of Frederick V, Elector Palatine (of the House of Wittelsbach), the "Winter King" of Bohemia, by his consort, the British princess Elizabeth Stuart. Gustavus was born in the Dutch Republic, where his family had sought refuge after the sequestration of the Electorate during the Thirty Years' War. Gustavus's brother Charles Louis was, as part of the Peace of Westphalia, restored to the Palatinate.

Biography 
Prince Gustavus was born in The Hague, where his parents lived in exile after his father lost the Battle of White Mountain and was driven from the thrones of both Bohemia and the Palatinate. He was named after King Gustavus Adolphus of Sweden, a close friend of both his parents. His paternal grandparents were Frederick IV and of Louise Juliana of Nassau and his maternal grandparents were James VI and I and Anne of Denmark. His father, a Calvinist, died on 29 November 1632, when Gustavus was a baby.

Gustavus died of epilepsy on 9 January 1641, at 8 years of age.

Ancestry

References

Bibliography 
 Carl Eduard Vehse: Geschichte der deutschen Höfe seit der Reformation: 4. Abth., Geschichte der Höfe der Häuser Baiern, Würtemberg, Baden und Hessen; 2. Th, Band 24, Hoffmann und Campe, 1853, S. 101 (in German)

House of Palatinate-Simmern
Simmern, Edward, Count Palatine of
1632 births
1641 deaths
Princes of the Palatinate
Royalty and nobility who died as children
Sons of kings
Deaths from epilepsy